Louis, the Child King is a 1993 French drama film directed by Roger Planchon. It was entered into the 1993 Cannes Film Festival.

Cast
 Carmen Maura - Anne d'Autriche
 Maxime Mansion - Louis XIV
 Paolo Graziosi - Mazarin
 Jocelyn Quivrin - Philippe, Duc d'Anjou
 Hervé Briaux - Gaston d'Orléans
 Brigitte Catillon - Duchesse de Chevreuse
 Irina Dalle - Grande Mademoiselle
 Serge Dupire - Prince de Condé
 Isabelle Gélinas - Duchesse de Châtillon
 Michèle Laroque - Duchesse de Longueville
 Aurélien Recoing - Jean François Paul de Gondi
 Régis Royer - Prince de Conti
 Vanessa Wagner - Charlotte de Chevreuse
 Laurent Gamelon - Descouches
 Maurice Barrier - Guitaud
 Marco Bisson - Le duc de Nemours
 Carlo Brandt - Duc de la Rochefoucauld
 Charles Berling

References

External links

1993 films
1993 drama films
French drama films
1990s French-language films
Films directed by Roger Planchon
Films produced by Margaret Ménégoz
1990s French films